As part of India's Central Vista Redevelopment Project, a new parliament building is currently under construction in New Delhi. Once completed, it will be the seat of the Parliament of India, which currently occupies Parliament House, located directly opposite the new building's site.

Background
Proposals for a new parliament building to replace the existing complex emerged in early 2010s on account of stability concerns with older structure. A committee to suggest several alternatives to the current building had been set up by then-Speaker Meira Kumar in 2012. The present building, a 93-year-old structure, is deemed to suffer from inadequacy of space to house members and their staff, and is thought to suffer from structural issues. Despite this, the building is deemed to be important to India's national heritage, and plans are in place to protect the structure.

Commencement
The Indian government in 2019 launched the Central Vista Redevelopment Project, with the construction of a new parliament building as a part, alongside other projects in New Delhi, including revamping Kartavya Path, construction of a new residence for the Vice President, a new office and residence for the Prime Minister and combining all ministerial buildings in a single central secretariat.

The groundbreaking ceremony for the new building was held in October 2020. The foundation stone was laid on 10 December 2020.

Although the laying of the foundation stone was allowed, Justice A. M. Khanwilkar of the Supreme Court of India put a hold on Central Vista Redevelopment Project at whole until resolution of pleas received against the project in the court. On 10 December 2020, Prime Minister Narendra Modi laid the foundation stone of the building. The ceremony included an inter-faith prayer service, performed by religious leaders. The project was cleared in a majority judgment of the Supreme Court in January 2021, with riders for environmental concerns, and work on the building was begun.

Description
According to Bimal Patel, the architect in charge of the redesign of Central Vista, the new complex will have a triangular shape. It will be built next to the existing complex and will be almost equal to the former one.

The building is designed to have a lifespan of more than 150 years. It is designed to be earthquake resistant and will incorporate architectural styles from different parts of India. The proposed chambers for the Lok Sabha and the Rajya Sabha will have large seating capacities to accommodate more members than are currently present, since the number of MPs may increase with India's growing population and consequent future delimitation.

The new complex will have 888 seats in the Lok Sabha chamber and 384 seats in the Rajya Sabha chamber. Unlike the present parliament building, it will not have a central hall. The Lok Sabha chamber will be able to house 1,272 members in case of a joint session. The rest of the building will have 4 floors with offices of ministers and committee rooms.

The building will have a built area of 20,866 m2 (including its open-sky area of 2,000 m2 for a banyan tree), which makes it 10% smaller in size than the existing old circular building of 22,900 m2 (diameter 170.7 m) including its open sky area of 6,060 m2 or 1.5 acres, split in 3 sectors each half an acre.

Timeline 
 Sep 2019: The master plan of 'Redevelopment of Central Vista Avenue' is conceived by the Government of India.
 Sep 2020: Tata Projects Ltd won the contract for construction of the new parliament building for ₹862 crores by the CPWD. 
 Oct 2020: Ahmedabad based HCP Design Planning and Management Pvt Ltd, won the architectural consultancy work.
 Dec 2020: Foundation stone of the new parliament building laid by Prime Minister of India Narendra Modi on 10 December 2020.
 Dec 2021: The Union Housing Ministry on 2 December informs in the Ongoing Parliament Session that the physical progress of the new Parliament building stands at 35% and is scheduled to be completed by October 2022.
 11 July 2022: Prime Minister Narendra Modi unveiled the statue of national emblem on top of the new Parliament building.
 4 August 2022 : Construction work on the new Parliament building is 70% complete, Union minister of state for housing and urban affairs Kaushal Kishore informed in Lok Sabha.
 28 August 2022 : Main structure of new Parliament completed, finishing work in progress: Tata Project CEO
 19 November 2022 : Parliament Winter Session is likely to be held in the old parliament building as the construction of the new building may stretch until the end of the year due to delay caused by Ukraine War. The remaining work such as the office of ministers and other facilities can't be completed before February or March 2023 : Sources
 20 December 2022 : It's a race against time to complete the new Parliament building, with the government keen to open the new building in the coming budget session that starts in January, and with a break in the middle, goes on till March 2023 : Government Officials

 5 January 2023 : Lok Sabha Secretariat has started preparing new identity cards for MPs to access the new Parliament building, sources said on Thursday. The MPs are also being trained on the audiovisual devices to be used in the new building. 
10 January 2023 : Construction of new Parliament building expected to be completed by January end: Government Sources
31 January 2023 : The CPWD has invited bids for mechanised housekeeping of the new Parliament building at a cost of around Rs 24.65 crore for three years, according to an official document

See also 
 Central Vista Redevelopment Project

References 

Parliament of India
Seats of national legislatures
Government buildings in Delhi
Buildings and structures under construction in India